Adam C. Begley (born 1959 in Boston, Massachusetts) is an American freelance writer, and was the books editor for The New York Observer from 1996 to 2009.

Begley is the son of Sally (Higginson) and novelist Louis Begley. He graduated from Harvard College, and from Stanford University with a Ph.D. in 1989.
His work has appeared in The New York Times, the Los Angeles Times, The Guardian, and the Financial Times.

He lives with his wife, Anne Cotton, and stepchildren, in Great Gidding, Cambridgeshire. 
He wrote a biography of author John Updike, published by HarperCollins in 2014, and a biography of French photographer Nadar, published by Tim Duggan Books in 2017. He is a contributing interviewer to the Paris Reviews Art of Fiction series.

Awards
2010 Guggenheim Fellowship
2011 Leon Levy Center for Biography Fellowship

Works

 Literary Agents: A Writer’s Guide. Adam Begley, Debby Mayer, Penguin Books, 1993, 
The Art of Fiction No. 135: Don DeLillo, Paris Review, 1993
 The Salon.com Reader's Guide to Contemporary Authors, Laura Miller, Adam Begley, Penguin Books, 2000, 
The Art of Fiction No. 173: Ian McEwan, Paris Review, 2002
The Art of Fiction No. 179: Jim Crace, Paris Review, 2003
 Certitude: A Profusely Illustrated Guide to Blockheads and Bullheads, Past and Present, Adam Begley, Christopher Hitchens, Illustrator Edward Sorel, HARMONY, 2009, 
"Stendhal in Parma, Italy", The New York Times, December 27, 2009
The Art of Fiction No. 204: David Mitchell, Paris Review, 2010
 Updike, Adam Begley, Harper-Collins, New York, 2014, 
 The Great Nadar, Adam Begley, Tim Duggan Books, New York, 2017,

References

American male writers
1959 births
Writers from Boston
Harvard College alumni
Stanford University alumni
American expatriates in the United Kingdom
Living people
People from Huntingdonshire